The Gdynia Open was a pro–am minor-ranking snooker tournament, which was part of the Players Tour Championship. The tournament in the 2012/2013 was split in two parts, with the first part taking place at the World Snooker Academy in Sheffield, England and the second part at the Gdynia Sports Arena in Gdynia, Poland. In the 2013/2014 season the event was moved to the second half of the season, and the whole event took part in Gdynia. Mark Selby was the last champion, while Neil Robertson is the most successful player in the tournament's history having won the championship two times.

Winners

Stats

Finalists

See also
 2011 Warsaw Classic

References

External links
  

 
Recurring sporting events established in 2012
2012 establishments in England
2012 establishments in Poland
Players Tour Championship
Defunct snooker competitions
Recurring sporting events disestablished in 2016